Die sieben Worte Jesu Christi am Kreuz (The seven words of Jesus Christ on the Cross), SWV 478, is a German-language musical setting of the seven sayings of Jesus on the cross by Heinrich Schütz. It was written in Weissenfels around 1645 and revised in 1657. Schütz set the text of the biblical words in their context, framed by two stanzas from Johann Böschenstein's hymn "Da Jesus an dem Kreuze stund", as an oratorio or Passion cantata. He scored it for five voices (SATTB), five instrumental parts and continuo. The original title reads: Die Sieben Worte unsers lieben Erlösers u. Seeligmachers Jesu Christi, so er am Stamm des Hl. Kreuzes gesprochen (The seven words of our dear redeemer and saviour Jesus Christ, which he spoke on the stem of the Holy Cross).

History 
Schütz wrote the work in Weissenfels  around 1645, and revised it in 1655 to 1657. It was possibly composed for Protestant liturgy, such as the court of Margrave Christian Ernst von Brandenburg-Bayreuth, not the Catholic court in Dresden, or perhaps not for liturgy at all but for private devotion at court. The work was also performed in Leipzig. The oratorio is still in a fairly strict North German form, though more free than his four passion settings. The cover of a manuscript bears a poem which illustrates the meaning of the meditation: "Lebstu der Weltt, so bistu todt/ und kränckst Christum mit schmertzen / Stirbst' aber in seinen Wunden roth / So lebt er in deim Hertzen." (Lovest thou the World, then art thou dead, and the Lord must bear the Hurt / But dost thou die red in his Wounds, Then he liveth in thy Heart.)

Text 
The work is in three sections, with a central text body compiled from the four Gospels in the Luther Bible, with emphasis on the Seven Words. The hymn already contains a reflection on the Seven Words. In the following text and translation, the intervening text of the Evangelists, also set to be sung, is not shown.

Music 
Schütz set the text as an oratorio, or cantata for Passiontide, for five voices (SATTB), five instrumental parts and continuo. The two framing hymn stanzas are set as motets for five parts, not using the traditional hymn tune. The two sinfonias are identical. In the narrative central part, the Evangelist's words are set for one to four voices, SATB, while the second tenor is the vox Christi, the voice of Christ. According to an early manuscript, the instruments play only in the sinfonia and with the vox Christi, while the introduction, Evangelist and conclusion are accompanied only by the continuo. The instruments are not specified, and can be a choir of viols, or strings, or woodwind instruments. The two groups of performers can be placed apart in performance.

The narrative and the dialogue, in which the Seven Words appear, are composed like contemporary operatic recitative in a style that Schütz had learned in Venice. The sinfonia is one of few surviving instrumental works by Schütz.

The work is a precursor of his Passions. The treatment of the vox Christi with obbligato instruments was used by Bach in his St Matthew Passion. The music for the dialogues is rhetoric, following the text.

Recordings 
The work was first recorded in 1966 by Archiv: Peter Schreier and Theo Adam soloed with the Dresdner Kreuzchor under Rudolf Mauersberger. It was again recorded for Naxos in 2001 along with other sacred music by Schütz, conducted by Wolfgang Helbich. A reviewer described the work as a "distinctive and expansive score", and noted: "The depth of feeling offered by the principals is exceptional, with significant dramatic expression combined with conviction and appropriate reverence." The Dresdner Kammerchor recorded the work, along with Passions by Schütz, with soloists and a viol choir conducted by Hans-Christoph Rademann in 2012. A reviewer noted that the work was the highlight of the collection, with fine performances by the singers and expressive instrumental playing.

References

External links 
 
 
 

Compositions by Heinrich Schütz